The San Diego Top Guns were an American soccer team based in San Diego, California, that played in the USISL. They debuted in 1993 and team played home matches at San Diego Mesa College's football field, which was smaller than a regulation pitch. The Top Guns withdrew from USISL in September 1996 and forfeited their territorial rights.

Year-by-year

References

 
Defunct soccer clubs in California
USISL teams
Association football clubs established in 1994
Association football clubs disestablished in 1996
Soccer clubs in California
1994 establishments in California
1996 disestablishments in California